Donald Moore may refer to:

 Don A. Moore (academic) (born 1970), American academic
 Don A. Moore (politician) (1928–2012), American judge, lawyer, and politician in Illinois
 Don Moore (musician) (born 1937), American jazz bassist
 Don Moore (politician) (1928–2017), American politician, member of the Tennessee House of Representative and Tennessee Senate
 Donnie Moore (1954–1989), American baseball pitcher
 Donald Willard Moore, Black Canadian civil rights activist 

 Matt Moore (politician) (Donald Matthew Moore, born 1982), American political strategist